Autographa speciosa is a moth of the family Noctuidae. It is found in western Oregon, southern Vancouver Island and the Sierra Nevada range of California.

The wingspan is about 38 mm. Adults are on wing in midsummer.

External links
Bug Guide
 Images
Macromoths of Northwest Forests and Woodlands

Plusiini
Moths of North America
Moths described in 1902